R. Eric Lieb is an American writer currently working for Striking Distance Studios.

Career history
Lieb has held positions at Artisan Entertainment and Lionsgate.

He was the Director of Development for Fox Atomic, the youth-market film studio. Theatrical releases from the studio included Miss March, Jennifer's Body, and I Love You Beth Cooper, and 28 Weeks Later. At Fox Atomic, Lieb created Fox Atomic Comics.

Lieb was a founding partner of Blacklight Transmedia with Zak Kadison, Mark Long and Joanna Alexander, under a first-look deal with Imagine Entertainment. At Blacklight, Lieb focused on the creation and development of all film, video game, television, comic book and new media franchises.

Education
Lieb graduated in 2001 with a BA from the University of Southern California School of Cinema-Television.

References

American book editors
Living people
1979 births
USC School of Cinematic Arts alumni